The Baise Uprising, also known as the Youjiang Riots, was a military insurrection in late 1929 in Baise, Guangxi, China, instigated by the Chinese Communist Party using tense relations between warlords Yu Zuobai and Li Mingrui of the New Guangxi clique, that aimed at opposing Chiang Kai-shek and the Kuomintang party and seizing power by force. The uprising was led by Chen Haoren and Zhang Yunyi under the guidance of Deng Xiaoping and the CCP Guangdong Province Committee.

References

 
 
 

History of the Chinese Communist Party
Baise
1929 in China
Military history of Guangxi
Military operations of the Chinese Civil War
Protests in the Republic of China (1912–1949)